"All That You Are (X3)" (often shortened to "All That You Are") is a song by Canadian rock band Econoline Crush from their second studio album, The Devil You Know. The song was released as a single in Canada in 1997 and experienced commercial success, reaching number 12 on the RPM Top Singles chart. The song also received airplay in the United States in 1999, appearing on several Billboard rock charts.

Track listing
Canadian CD single
 "All That You Are (X3)" (Boomtang mix edit) – 3:48
 "All That You Are (X3)" (Boomtang extended remix) – 4:48

Charts

Weekly charts

Year-end charts

Release history

References

1997 singles
1997 songs
Restless Records singles